The 2004 Washington State Senate election was held on November 2, 2004, in which about half of the state's 49 legislative districts choose a state senator for a four-year term to the Washington State Senate. The other half of state senators are chosen in the next biennial election, so that about half of the senators, along with all the members of the Washington State House of Representatives, are elected every two years.

24 seats were up for their regular election this cycle, while 4 seats held special elections due to resignations by their incumbents, for a total of 28 seats on the ballot. Republicans held 15 of the seats and Democrats held the remaining 13. Democrats successfully flipped two seats in the general election.

Summary of results

Detailed results 
The 2004 election utilized an open primary system. Primary results can be found here and general election results can be found here.

District 1

District 2

District 3

District 4

District 5

District 6

District 8

District 9

District 10

District 11

District 12

District 14

District 16

District 17

District 18

District 19

District 20

District 22

District 23

District 24

District 25

District 27

District 28

District 38

District 39

District 40

District 41

District 49

References

See also

2004 Washington (state) elections
Washington State Senate elections
Washington Senate